Ivi Kreen (born October 9, 1935, in Kiviõli) is an Estonian former television presenter. She was presenter of the show Aktuaalne kaamera for Eesti Televisioon from 1961 to 1990.

References 

1935 births
Living people
Estonian television presenters
People from Kiviõli
20th-century Estonian people